Mount Combs is an isolated mountain rising above the ice surface at the base of Rydberg Peninsula, Palmer Land. It was discovered by the Ronne Antarctic Research Expedition (1947–48) under Finn Ronne, who named it for Representative J.M. Combs of Beaumont, Texas, who did much to gain support for the expedition.

References
 

Mountains of Palmer Land